Bradybatus is a genus of beetles belonging to the family Curculionidae. The species of this genus are found in Europe and Japan.

Species
The following species are recognised in the genus Bradybatus:
 Bradybatus abeillei Desbrochers, 1888
 Bradybatus aceris L.A.A.Chevrolat, 1866
 Bradybatus apicalis Pic & M., 1902
 Bradybatus arbeillei J.Desbrochers, 1888
 Bradybatus armiger T.Broun, 1893
 Bradybatus bituberculatus Cristofori & Jan, 1832
 Bradybatus carbonarius E.Reitter, 1884
 Bradybatus creutzeri Porta, 1932
 Bradybatus delagrangei J.Desbrochers, 1895
 Bradybatus duplicatus E.Reitter, 1898
 Bradybatus elongatulus Porta, 1932
 Bradybatus elongatus Boheman, 1835
 Bradybatus fallax Gerstaecker
 Bradybatus graciliformis Voss, 1960
 Bradybatus grandoides Dieckmann, 1968
 Bradybatus inermis Penecke, 1926
 Bradybatus kellneri Bach, 1854
 Bradybatus limbatus W.Roelofs, 1875
 Bradybatus minor Ter-Minasian, 1979
 Bradybatus nigripes E.Reitter, 1898
 Bradybatus ornatoides E.Reitter, 1898
 Bradybatus persicus Dieckmann, 1982
 Bradybatus robustirostris J.Desbrochers, 1868
 Bradybatus rufipennis E.Reitter, 1898
 Bradybatus seriesetosus Petri, 1912
 Bradybatus sharpi H.Tournier, 1873
 Bradybatus subfasciatus Gerstaecker
 Bradybatus tomentosus J.Desbrochers, 1892
 Bradybatus turkmenicus Ter-Minasian, 1979
 Bradybatus vaulogeri L.Bedel, 1905

References

Curculioninae
Curculionidae genera